Three-headed monster may refer to:

Azi dahaka, a three-headed dragon in Persian mythology
Cerberus, a multi-headed (usually three-headed) dog in Greek and Roman mythology
Zmiy Gorynych, a multi-headed (usually three-headed) Slavic dragon
King Ghidorah, a three-headed dragon in the Godzilla franchise
Ghidorah, the Three-Headed Monster (1964), the kaiju film in which Ghidorah debuted
Triple deity, a deity associated with the number three in mythology
3-Headed Shark Attack (2015), horror film
3 Headed Monsters, a 3x3 basketball team

See also
Two-Headed Monster, a Muppets character